Mineral and Petroleum Resources Development Act (MPRDA) is an act of the Parliament of South Africa. It came into effect on May 1, 2004, and now governs the acquisition, use and disposal of mineral rights. The old common-law principles are therefore no longer applicable. The MPRDA entrenches state power and control over the mineral and petroleum resources of the country.

See also 
 Mining industry of South Africa
 South African property law

References 
 Mineral and Petroleum Resources Development Act 28 of 2002.

External links 
 Mineral and Petroleum Resources Development Act (No. 28 of 2002)

Notes 

2002 in South African law
South African legislation
Energy law